General elections were held in Ghana on 7 December 2004. The presidential elections resulted in a victory for incumbent John Kufuor of the New Patriotic Party (NPP), who defeated John Atta-Mills of the National Democratic Congress with 52 percent of the vote in the first round, enough to win without the need for a runoff. The parliamentary elections saw the NPP win 128 seats in the expanded 230-seat Parliament, an outright majority.

Presidential election
There were four candidates:
George Aggudey (Convention People's Party)
John Kufuor (New Patriotic Party) - incumbent
John Atta Mills (National Democratic Congress)
Edward Mahama (Grand Coalition, an alliance of the People's National Convention, Every Ghanaian Living Everywhere, and Great Consolidated Popular Party)

Results

President

Parliament

See also
List of MPs elected in the 2004 Ghanaian parliamentary election

References

External links
Ghana Elections 2004 - Think Ghana
2004 results - Stanford University Archive Portal
2004 results - Friedrich Ebert Stiftung

Elections in Ghana
Ghana
2004 in Ghana
Presidential elections in Ghana
Ghana